Man-portable air-defense systems (MANPADS or MPADS) are portable surface-to-air missiles. They are guided weapons and are a threat to low-flying aircraft, especially helicopters.

Overview
MANPADS were developed in the 1950s to provide military ground forces with protection from jet aircraft. They have received a great deal of attention, partly because armed groups have used them against commercial airliners. These missiles, affordable and widely available through a variety of sources, have been used successfully over the past three decades both in military conflicts, as well as by terrorist organizations.

Twenty-five countries, including the United Kingdom, the United States, Poland, Sweden, Russia, and Iran produce man-portable air defense systems. Possession, export, and trafficking of such weapons is officially tightly controlled, due to the threat they pose to civil aviation, although such efforts have not always been successful.

Missile types

Infrared

Infrared homing missiles are designed to home-in on a heat source on an aircraft, typically the engine exhaust plume, and detonate a warhead in or near the heat source to disable the aircraft. These missiles use passive guidance, meaning that they do not emit signals to detect a heat source, which makes them difficult to detect by targeted aircraft employing countermeasure systems.

First generation
The first missiles deployed in the 1960s were infrared missiles. First generation MANPADS, such as the US Redeye, early versions of the Soviet 9K32 Strela-2, and the Chinese HN-5 (copy of Soviet Strela-2), are considered "tail-chase weapons" as their uncooled spin-scan seekers can only discern the superheated interior of the target's jet engine from background noise. This means they are only capable of accurately tracking the aircraft from the rear when the engines are fully exposed to the missile's seeker and provide a sufficient thermal signature for engagement. First generation IR missiles are also highly susceptible to interfering thermal signatures from background sources, including the sun, which many experts feel makes them somewhat unreliable, and they are prone to erratic behaviour in the terminal phase of engagement. While less effective than more modern weapons, they remain common in irregular forces as they are not limited by the short shelf-life of gas coolant cartridges used by later systems.

Second generation
Second generation infrared missiles, such as early versions of the U.S. Stinger, the Soviet Strela-3, and the Chinese FN-6, use gas-cooled seeker heads and a conical scanning technique, which enables the seeker to filter out most interfering background IR sources as well as permitting head-on and side engagement profiles. Later versions of the Redeye MANPADS are regarded as straddling the first and second generations as they are gas-cooled but still use a spin-scan seeker.

Third generation
Third generation infrared MANPADS, such as the French Mistral, the Soviet 9K38 Igla, and the US Stinger B, use rosette scanning detectors to produce a quasi-image of the target. Their seeker compares input from multiple detections bands, either two widely separated IR bands or IR and UV, giving them much greater ability to discern and reject countermeasures deployed by the target aircraft.

Fourth generation
Fourth generation missiles, such as the canceled American FIM-92 Stinger Block 2, Russian Verba, Chinese QW-4, and Japanese Type 91 surface-to-air missile use imaging infrared focal plane array guidance systems and other advanced sensor systems, which permit engagement at greater ranges.

Command line-of-sight

Command guidance (CLOS) missiles do not home in on a particular aspect (heat source or radio or radar transmissions) of the targeted aircraft. Instead, the missile operator or gunner visually acquires the target using a magnified optical sight and then uses radio controls to "fly" the missile into the aircraft. One of the benefits of such a missile is that it is virtually immune to flares and other basic countermeasure systems that are designed primarily to defeat IR missiles. The major drawback of CLOS missiles is that they require highly trained and skilled operators. Numerous reports from the Soviet–Afghan War in the 1980s cite Afghan mujahedin as being disappointed with the British-supplied Blowpipe CLOS missile because it was too difficult to learn to use and highly inaccurate, particularly when employed against fast-moving jet aircraft. Given these considerations, many experts believe that CLOS missiles are not as ideally suited for untrained personnel use as IR missiles, which sometimes are referred to as "fire and forget" missiles.

Later versions of CLOS missiles, such as the British Javelin, use a solid-state television camera in lieu of the optical tracker to make the gunner's task easier. The Javelin's manufacturer, Thales Air Defence, claims that their missile is virtually impervious to countermeasures.

Laser guided

Laser guided MANPADS use beam-riding guidance where a sensor in the missile's tail detects the emissions from a laser on the launcher and attempts to steer the missile to fly at the exact middle of the beam, or between two beams. Missiles such as Sweden's RBS-70 and Britain's Starstreak can engage aircraft from all angles and only require the operator to continuously track the target using a joystick to keep the laser aim point on the target: the latest version of RBS 70 features a tracking engagement mode where fine aim adjustments of the laser emitter are handled by the launcher itself, with the user only having to make coarse aim corrections. Because there are no radio data links from the ground to the missile, the missile cannot be effectively jammed after it is launched. Even though beam-riding missiles require relatively extensive training and skill to operate, many experts consider these missiles particularly menacing due to the missiles' resistance to most conventional countermeasures in use today.

Notable uses

Against military aircraft 
 List of Soviet aircraft losses in Afghanistan
 Argentine air forces in the Falklands War
 British air services in the Falklands War.
 On 27 February 1991, during Operation Desert Storm, an USAF F-16 was shot down by an Igla-1.
 On 16 April 1994, during Operation Deny Flight a Sea Harrier of the 801 Naval Air Squadron of the Royal Navy, operating from the aircraft carrier HMS Ark Royal, was brought down by an Igla-1.
 On 30 August 1995, during Operation Deliberate Force, a French Air Force Mirage 2000D was shot down over Bosnia by a heat-seeking 9K38 Igla missile fired by air defense units of Army of Republika Srpska, prompting efforts to obtain improved defensive systems.
 On 27 May 1999, the Anza Mk-II was used to attack Indian aircraft during the Kargil conflict with India. A MiG-27 of the Indian Air Force was shot down by Pakistan Army Air Defence forces.
 List of Russian aircraft losses in the Second Chechen War
 List of Coalition aircraft crashes in Afghanistan
 List of aviation shootdowns and accidents during the Iraq War
 2002 Khankala Mi-26 crash: On 19 August 2002, a Russian-made Igla shoulder-fired surface-to-air missile hit an overloaded Mil Mi-26 helicopter, causing it to crash into a minefield at the main military base at Khankala near the capital city of Grozny, Chechnya. 127 Russian troops and crew were killed.
 In the 2008 South Ossetia War, Polish made Grom MANPADS were used by Georgia
 Syrian Civil War
On 3 February 2018, a Russian Sukhoi Su-25 piloted by Major Roman Filipov was shot down by a MANPADS over rebel-held territory while conducting airstrikes over Syria's northwestern city of Saraqib.
 War in Donbas
2022 Russian invasion of Ukraine

Against cruise missiles
On 10 October 2022, during the 2022 Russian invasion of Ukraine, Ukrainian forces were recorded allegedly shooting down a Russian cruise missile using MANPADS. Since then, other instances have been videoed and shared on social media platforms.

Against civilian aircraft
 The 1978 Air Rhodesia Viscount shootdown is the first example of a civilian airliner shot down by a man-portable surface-to-air missile. The pilot of the aircraft managed to make a controlled crash landing.
 Air Rhodesia Flight 827 was also shot down in February 1979 by the Zimbabwe People's Revolutionary Army armed with a Strela 2 missile. All 59 passengers and crew were killed.
 The 1993 Sukhumi airliner attacks involved 5 civilian aircraft shot down within a total of 4 days in Sukhumi, Abkhazia, Georgia, killing 108 people.
 On 6 April 1994, a surface-to-air missile struck one of the wings of the Dassault Falcon 50 carrying three French crew and nine passengers, including Rwandan president Juvénal Habyarimana and Burundian president Cyprien Ntaryamira, as it prepared to land in Kigali, Rwanda, before a second missile hit its tail. The plane erupted into flames in mid-air before crashing into the garden of the presidential palace, exploding on impact. This incident was the ignition spark of the Rwandan genocide.
 1998 Lionair Flight LN 602 shootdown: On 7 October 1998, the Tamil Tigers shot down an aircraft off the coast of Sri Lanka.
 2002 Mombasa airliner attack: On 28 November 2002, two shoulder-launched Strela 2 (SA-7) surface-to-air missiles were fired at a chartered Boeing 757 airliner as it took off from Moi International Airport. The missiles missed the aircraft which continued safely to Tel Aviv, carrying 271 vacationers from Mombasa back to Israel. In the photos, the missile systems were painted in light blue, the color used in the Soviet military for training material (a training SA-7 round would not have the guidance system).
 2003 Baghdad DHL attempted shootdown incident: On 22 November 2003, an Airbus A300B4-203F cargo plane, operating on behalf of DHL was hit by an SA-14 missile, which resulted in the loss of its hydraulic systems. The crew later landed the crippled aircraft safely by using only differential engine thrust by adjusting the individual throttle controls of each engine.
 2007 Mogadishu TransAVIAexport Airlines Il-76 crash: On 23 March 2007, a TransAVIAexport Airlines Ilyushin Il-76 airplane crashed in outskirts of Mogadishu, Somalia, during the 2007 Battle of Mogadishu. Witnesses claim that a surface-to-air missile was fired immediately prior to the accident. However, Somali officials deny that the aircraft was shot down.

Countermeasures

Man-portable air defense systems are a popular black market item for insurgent forces. Their proliferation became the subject of the Wassenaar Arrangement's (WA)22 Elements for Export Controls of MANPADS, the G8 Action Plan of 2 June 2003, the October 2003 Asia-Pacific Economic Cooperation (APEC) Summit, Bangkok Declaration on Partnership for the Future and in July 2003 the Organization for Security and Co-operation in Europe (OSCE), Forum for Security Co-operation, Decision No. 7/03: Man-portable Air Defense Systems.

Understanding the problem in 2003, Colin Powell remarked that there was "no threat more serious to aviation" than the missiles, which can be used to shoot down helicopters and commercial airliners, and are sold illegally for as little as a few hundred dollars. The U.S. has led a global effort to dismantle these weapons, with over 30,000 voluntarily destroyed since 2003, but probably thousands are still in the hands of insurgents, especially in Iraq, where they were looted from the military arsenals of the former dictator Saddam Hussein, and in Afghanistan as well. In August 2010, a report by the Federation of American Scientists (FAS) confirmed that "only a handful" of illicit MANPADS were recovered from national resistance caches in Iraq in 2009, according to media reports and interviews with military sources.

Military
With the growing number of MANPADS attacks on civilian airliners, a number of different countermeasure systems have been developed specifically to protect aircraft against the missiles.
AN/ALQ-144, AN/ALQ-147 and AN/ALQ-157 are U.S.-produced systems, developed by Sanders Associates in the 1970s.
 AN/ALQ-212 ATIRCM, AN/AAQ-24 Nemesis are NATO systems developed by BAE Systems and Northrop Grumman respectively.

Civilian
 Civil Aircraft Missile Protection System (CAMPS)—Developed by Saab Avitronics, Chemring Countermeasures and Naturelink Aviation, using non-pyrotechnic infrared decoy

Weapons by country

China
HN-5
HN-6
QW-1
QW-11
QW-11G
QW-1A
QW-1M
QW-2
QW-3
FN-6
QW-1 Vanguard
TB-1
France
Mistral 1 
Mistral 2
Mistral 3
United Kingdom
Blowpipe
Javelin
Starburst
Starstreak
India
MPDMS
VSHORAD
Iran
Misagh-1
Misagh-2
Misagh-3
Qaem
Japan
Type 91 (SAM-2, SAM-2B)
Pakistan
 Anza:
 Anza Mk-I
 Anza Mk-II
 Anza Mk-III
Poland
Grom
Piorun
Romania
 CA-94:
 CA-94M
Soviet Union/Russian Federation
9K32M 'Strela-2' (SA-7)
9K36 'Strela-3' (SA-14)
9K310 'Igla-M' (SA-16)
9K38 'Igla' (SA-18)
9K338 ' Igla-S' (SA-24)
9K333 'Verba' (SA-25) 
Sweden
RBS 70
 RBS 70 NG
United States
FIM-43 'Redeye'
FIM-92 'Stinger'
South Korea
Chiron
North Korea
HT-16PGJ
Turkey
Sungur
PorSav

Black market
Although most MANPADS are owned and accounted for by governments, political upheavals and corruption have allowed thousands of them to enter the black market. In the years 1998–2018, at least 72 non-state groups have fielded MANPADS. Civilians in the United States cannot legally own MANPADS.

See also
 Anti-aircraft warfare
 Infrared countermeasure
 Aerial countermeasures
 Civil Aircraft Missile Protection System
 Flight Guard
 Northrop Grumman Guardian
 Man-portable anti-tank systems

References
Portions of this article were taken from Homeland Security: Protecting Airliners from Terrorist Missiles , CRS Report for Congress RL31741, February 16, 2006 by the Congressional Research Service, division of The Library of Congress which as a work of the Federal Government exists in the public domain.

External links

MANPADS Proliferation —links to hundreds of documents on MANPADS, their proliferation, and control efforts
Man-Portable Air Defence Systems (MANPADS) Small Arms Survey Research Note
Man Portable Missiles vs Airliners
Are Helicopters Vulnerable?—Analysis of MANPADS effectiveness.
Man Portable AIr Defense System—GlobalSecurity.Org article covering period until 1999.
MANPADS: Combating the Threat to Global Aviation from Man-Portable Air Defense Systems

Surface-to-air missiles
Infantry weapons
Portable tools